FC Hochdorf is a Swiss football club. It currently compete at Regional Verbaende of Innerschweizerischer Fussballverband group (5th level).

History
Hochdorf played at 2. Liga interregional between 2000 and 2004.

Staff and board members

 Trainer: Rémo Meyer
 Goalkeeper Coach: Patrick Pfrunder
 Physio: Roger Schwendener
 President: Lisbeth Schwegler
 Vice President: Marcel Villiger
 Secretary : Andreas Unternährer
 Treasurer : Andreas Fecker

External links
Official Website 

Football clubs in Switzerland
Association football clubs established in 1921
Canton of Lucerne
1921 establishments in Switzerland